Marty Mitchell may refer to:

 Martin Mitchell (born 1986), rugby league player
 Marty Mitchell (singer), American singer-songwriter and guitarist